Georgetown Brewing Company is a brewery in Seattle's Georgetown neighborhood, USA. It originally sold only draft beer and for a time was the largest draft-only brewery in the United States. In May 2017 Georgetown began to offer its Bodhizafa IPA, Lucille IPA, and Roger's Pilsner in 12 oz. cans. The primary brew is a pale ale called Manny's.

History
The brewery was founded in 2002 by Manny Chao and Roger Bialous. Chao was one of the original employees of Mac & Jack's Brewing Company. Georgetown Brewing Company was started with an initial investment of $200,000. Within its first year, the brewery had broken even with 80 restaurant and bar accounts. It was originally located in a space at the historic Seattle Brewing and Malting Plant, where Rainier Beer was once produced. The company relocated to a larger space in 2008 to increase capacity.

Manny's Pale Ale
Manny's Pale Ale was the first beer offered by the brewery. As of April 2011, it accounted for 85% of Georgetown's business and was available in about 500 bars around Seattle. The company's website describes it as a pale ale with a "rich and complex malty middle with a snappy hop finish."

Point Break Inspired Beers
Two full-time beers have naming connections to the 1991 cult-classic film Point Break starring Patrick Swayze as Bodhi and Keanu Reeves as Johnny Utah: IPA Bodhizafa  and pale ale Johnny Utah  where the product page says, "Get me two!"

References

External links

 Georgetown Brewing Company, company website

Beer brewing companies based in Washington (state)
Food and drink companies based in Seattle
Manufacturing companies based in Seattle
2002 establishments in Washington (state)